Halfway to Shanghai is a 1942 American adventure film directed by John Rawlins and written by Stuart Palmer. The film stars Kent Taylor, Irene Hervey, Henry Stephenson, J. Edward Bromberg, George Zucco and Charles Wagenheim. The film was released on September 18, 1942, by Universal Pictures.

Plot

Jonathan Peale, a renegade Nazi spy, is aboard a Rangoon-bound train, carrying a map containing the locations of China's main munitions dumps. He is watched on the train by Gestapo agent Karl Zerta and his aide, Otto Van Shocht, who both fear that Peale may decide to sell the map to the highest bidder. Also aboard the train are civil engineer Alexander Barton and his former sweetheart, Vicki Nelson, who see each other for the first time in two years. Alexander has recently completed work on the construction of the Burma Road, and of the eight Americans who were assigned to that project, he is the only one still alive. Having assumed that her true love was killed along with the others, Vicki has agreed to a marriage with a rich rajah. The two rekindle their love and agree to meet later that night in Alexander's compartment, after Nicolas, the rajah's matrimonial scout and Vicki's personal guard, has fallen asleep. Zerta and Otto soon find themselves in a poker game with Alexander, Jonathan and Colonel Blimpton, a retired British army officer. Realizing his dire predicament, Jonathan leaves the game early, then hides in Alexander's compartment. When Alexander discovers him there, he demands that Jonathan leave before Vicki's arrival. The desperate spy then knocks the engineer unconscious, only to have Zerta arrive moments later and kill him. The Gestapo men rearrange the evidence to make it appear that Alexander committed the murder. In the meantime, American aviatrix and newspaper correspondent Caroline Wrallins comes into the possession of Jonathan's prized map. When Zerta confronts her, Caroline states that, unlike most of her fellow Americans, she is a supporter of Adolf Hitler and his Nazi regime. Burmese police detective Yinpore, in his investigation of Jonathan's death, finally deduces that Zerta is the real murderer. Marion Mills, Caroline's brow-beaten secretary, tells the detective of her boss and Zerta's Nazi connections, and the map is recovered. Zerta and Otto are killed by the Burmese police as they attempt to escape, and Caroline is arrested. Alexander and Vicki then decide to take a boat back to America to start a new life together.

Cast        
Kent Taylor as Alexander Barton
Irene Hervey as Vicky Neilson
Henry Stephenson as Colonel Algernon Blimpton
J. Edward Bromberg as Major Vinpore
George Zucco as Peter van Hoost
Charles Wagenheim as Jonathan Peale
Alexander Granach as Mr. Nikolas
Lionel Royce as Otto von Schact
Willie Fung as Mr. Wu
Oscar O'Shea as Doctor McIntyre
Charlotte Wynters as Caroline Rawlins
Mary Gordon as Mrs. McIntyre
Fay Helm as Marion Mills
Frank Lackteen as Train Conductor
Charles Stevens as Ali

References

External links
 

1942 films
American adventure films
1942 adventure films
Universal Pictures films
Films directed by John Rawlins
American black-and-white films
1940s English-language films
1940s American films